Oceaniradius stylonematis  is a species of bacteria from the family of Phyllobacteriaceae. It is the only member of the genus Oceaniradius.

References

Phyllobacteriaceae